Bill O'Brien (23 March 1877 – 31 March 1942) was  a former Australian rules footballer who played with Collingwood in the Victorian Football League (VFL).

Notes

External links 

Bill O'Brien's profile at Collingwood Forever

1877 births
1942 deaths
Australian rules footballers from Victoria (Australia)
Collingwood Football Club players
West Melbourne Football Club players